Association football in Vietnam is run by the Vietnam Football Federation. The federation administers the Vietnamese national football teams including the Men's and Women's teams. It is also responsible for the national football leagues including the V.League 1, which is the top tier of professional football in Vietnam.

Association football is the most popular sport in Vietnam. Its annual V-League competition has taken place every year since 1980 (except in 1988 and 1999).

When Vietnam was divided into the two countries as North Vietnam and South Vietnam from 1954 to 1976, two national teams existed. The North Vietnamese team was not very active, playing almost exclusively other Communist countries between 1956 and 1966 whilst the South Vietnamese team took part in the first two AFC Asian Cup finals, finishing fourth both times.

History
Football came into Vietnam with the French in 1896. It was first introduced in Cochinchina (Nam Kỳ), and then spread to the central and northern parts of the colony.

Until 1954

Cochinchina
Football was introduced to Saigon by French civil servants, merchants and soldiers. Some locals also adopted the game at this time. A club called Cercle Sportif Saigonnais (Saigon Sports Circle) was founded. Games were played at the city park, called Jardin de la Ville (today Tao Đàn Park).

In 1905, a British warship named after King Alfred visited Saigon and its football team had a friendly match against a local team composed of Vietnamese and French players. This is considered the first international football match in Vietnam.

E. Breton, a member of France's L'Union des Sociétés Français des Sports Athlétiques brought football rules into Vietnam in 1906. As a chairman of Cercle Sportif Saigonnais, he reorganized the club similar to football clubs in France. Other clubs, such as Infanterie, Saigon Sport, Athletic Club, Stade Militaire and Tabert Club, were founded around that time.  Local cups were soon held afterwards. Cercle Sportif Saigonnais was the most successful team, winning in 1907, 1909, 1910, 1911, 1912, 1916.

Some Vietnamese locals learned the game's rules and established their own teams. The first two Vietnamese teams founded in 1907 were Gia Định Sport, run by Ba Vẻ, and Phú Khai and Ngôi Sao Xanh (Blue Star), run by Nguyễn Đình Trị. These two teams then came together to form "Ngôi sao Gia Định" (Gia Định Star). Prior to 1920, it had defeated all other teams, including Cercle Sportif Saigonnais (in 1917), and became the champion.

Other teams of the time include: Victoria Sportive, Commerce Sport, Jean Compte, Sport Cholonaise, Khánh Hội Sport, Tân Định Sport, Gò Vấp, Hiệp Hòa, Chợ Quán, Phú Nhuận, Đồng Nai, Enfants de Troupe; in other provinces: Thủ Dầu Một, Cần Thơ, Sóc Trăng, Sa Đéc, Gò Công, Châu Đốc, Mỹ Tho.  New grounds were also developed, namely Citadelle, Renault (in front of current Thống Nhất Stadium), Fourière, Mayer, and Marine.

Football fans and some leaders then managed to form the (Vietnamese) Department of Football. Nguyễn Đình Trị was elected as head of board of directors and the Department itself developed its own field. At that time, there was already a French Department of Football. The French and Vietnamese departments had no cooperation but some matches were played between sides representing each department, for instance in the Cochin China Championship. In a match between Cercle Sportif Saigonnais and Ngôi sao Gia Định in 1925, Paul Thi, Ngôi sao's player was dismissed by a French referee. This led to his everlasting suspension and further conflicts between the two departments. The Championship was then delayed for many years until it was once again held in 1932, with six Vietnamese and three French teams taking part.

Between 1925 and 1935, Ngôi sao Gia Định were known for many famous players, e.g. Sách, Thơm, Nhiều, Quý, Tịnh, Xường, Trung, Thi, Vi, Mùi.  About 29 cups were held, with Ngôi sao winning 8 of them.

The first woman football team appeared in Cần Thơ in 1932, called Cái Vồn. Several years later, another team called "Rạch Giá" was founded. In 1933, Cái Vồn had a match with men's Paul Bert team at Mayer Stadium. The match ended in a two-all draw and became historic in Vietnamese football history.

Tonkinchina and the Central Zone
Football came to the North of Vietnam (or Tonkinchina) in about 1906–1907. Local press reported on matches played by Legion Đáp Cầu and Olympique Hải Phòng in 1909. Olympique won the first match 2–1, whereas the second match was won 8-1 by Legion. In February 1912, Hanoi Football club (Stade Hanoien) was founded. The team was composed of Vietnamese and French players.

1954-1976 period
Football activities in Vietnam were delayed during World War II and the Indochina Wars and soon restored after 1954, when the Geneva Accord was signed, dividing the North and South of Vietnam.

North Vietnam
In North Vietnam, Thể Công team of People's Army was established on 23 September 1954. The national football team gained notable achievements at some regional events, such as Ganefo (Indonesia, 1963) and Asian Ganefo (Cambodia, 1966). The national league was called the North Vietnam V-League.

South Vietnam
By the late 1950s, South Vietnam national football team had become one of the four strongest teams in Asia, as they advanced into the final round of 1960 AFC Asian Cup together with South Korea, Israel and the Republic of China.  The team also won 10th Merdeka Cup in Malaysia, 1966.

Clubs AJS, Cảnh sát (Police), Tổng Tham Mưu (ARVN General Staff) and Quan Thuế (Customs) dominated the South's football until 1975. The national league was called the South Vietnam V-League.

Since 1976
Vietnam returned to international football at 1991, when they participated at the 1991 Southeast Asian Games. They drew 2–2 to the Philippines (which hosted the tournament), in the first ever match played by a united Vietnam. During the 1990s-2000s, Vietnam had limited international success, mostly due to a lack of investments. Vietnamese football have also suffered several corruption scandals.

Despite this, Vietnam made some notable performances, at the 2007 AFC Asian Cup when Vietnam shocked international football by gaining a ticket to the quarter-finals. Their 2–0 victory against the Gulf champions, the UAE, was especially remarkable. The following year, Vietnam won the 2008 AFF Championship, marking a successful period for Vietnamese football, the “first golden generation” and renaissance of Vietnamese football.

Vietnamese football would start to have a sharp decline between 2009-2016, where they would fail to qualify for 3 Asian cups, and lose the next 4 AFF Suzuki Cups. They also could not qualify for the FIFA World Cup. Meanwhile, the Olympic team did not do well in the next few Asian Games and Southeast Asian Games.

Following the 2017 FIFA U-20 World Cup, Vietnam would start to have tremendous success, after hiring Park Hang-Seo as coach. In 2018, the Vietnam national under-23 football team recorded another remarkable achievement during the 2018 AFC U-23 Championship, winning the silver medal after losing to Uzbekistan in the final, thus becoming the first Southeast Asian team to qualify for the final of an AFC tournament since 1998 when the Thailand U17 won the 1998 AFC U-17 Championship. Later that year, the Olympic team, consisting largely of players who had competed at the U-23 Championship in January, won the fourth place of the 2018 Asian Games, losing 1-3 to South Korea in the semi-final and the UAE on penalty shoot-out in the bronze medal match.

With most of these young players, Vietnam created a fever in 2019 AFC Asian Cup, in which the national team made it to the quarter-finals where they were defeated by eventual runners-up Japan with the score 0–1. Then in the 2019 Southeast Asian Games Vietnam won its first gold medal in men's football since 1959.

On 6 February 2022, the Vietnam women's national football team qualified for the 2023 FIFA Women's World Cup for the first time.

In the 2021 Southeast Asian Games, as hosts, both the men's and women's football team successfully defended their gold medal title in front of home fans.

Football culture in Vietnam

National identity
Football is an important part of the national identity in Vietnam. Although having a long history, modern Vietnamese football was developed very late than the rest, which only established at 1990s after the end of Sino-Vietnamese War and international isolation. Since 1990s, football has become extremely important for the society in Vietnam, regardless the rich or the poor. Despite ups and downs, football still plays a role on the rise of Vietnamese national identity, and often ties with its successes. Vietnam has some of the most passionate supporters in the world, often attend in large number anytime Vietnam plays in a major tournament. This has been witnessed in 2019 AFC Asian Cup, which its fans cooked traditional Vietnamese foods and even smuggled foods to the hotel to support its players.

Linking with nationalist sentiment

Vietnamese take pride on football heavily and in Vietnam, football is a God sport for the Vietnamese population in majority. When the national team won big matches, the streets are often overwhelmed by large Vietnamese crowds, demonstrating nationalist chants, singing Vietnamese nationalist songs.

According to the Bleacher Report, after the 2018 AFC U-23 Championship, they were totally astonished and shocked with the massive celebration of Vietnamese people.

Competitions

FIFA World Cup
Vietnam had never qualified for any final round of FIFA World Cup tournaments.

AFC Asian Cup
Vietnam, as South Vietnam, finished in 4th place in both the 1956 and 1960 editions. However, there were only 4 teams in the final round of the tournament.

Since the return of Vietnam to international stage at 1991, Vietnam enjoyed a smaller level of success, but it has been noted for notable achievements during 2007 AFC Asian Cup as host, when Vietnam was the only host team to qualify to quarterfinals before losing to eventual winner Iraq. This was also in the 2019 AFC Asian Cup where Vietnam made the quarterfinals but lost to eventual runners up Japan.

AFF Championship

Teams

Men
 Vietnam National Football Team
 Vietnam National Under-23 Football Team
 Vietnam National Under-21 Football Team
 Vietnam National Under-19 Football Team
 Vietnam National Under-16 Football Team
 Vietnam National Under-14 Football Team

Women
 Vietnam Women's National Football Team
 Vietnam Women's National Under-19 Football Team
 Vietnam Women's National Under-16 Football Team
 Vietnam Women's National Under-14 Football Team

Domestic leagues

For men

At the end of the 2015 season, the number of clubs in each league had changed. The 2016 V.League 1 contains 14 clubs, the 2016 V.League 2 contains 10 clubs, and the 2016 Vietnamese Second Division contains 14 clubs, with each group containing seven teams.
 Other leagues for men include:
 Vietnamese National U-21 Football Championship
 Vietnamese National U-19 Football Championship
 Vietnamese National U-17 Football Championship
 Vietnamese National U-15 Football Championship
 Vietnamese National Youth Football Championship
 Vietnamese National Kid Football Championship
 Vietnamese National Futsal League
 Vietnamese National Beach Soccer League

For women

Other leagues for women include:
 Vietnamese National Women's U-19 Football Championship
 Vietnamese National Women's U-16 Football Championship
 Vietnamese Women's Futsal Championship

Domestic cups
 Vietnamese National Football Cup
 Vietnamese National Football Super Cup
 Vietnamese Women's National Football Cup

International tournaments
 Ho Chi Minh City Cup
 VTV-T&T Cup
 VFF Cup
 Thanh Niên Newspaper Cup
 BTV Cup

Asian eligibility
Uniquely, Vietnam has two chances to acquire Asian gold, as the V-League winner is eligible for AFC Champions League group stage and runner-up for qualified AFC Cup group stage from 2022 V.League 1 while the Vietnamese Cup winner goes to the preliminary round of AFC Champions League.

Stadiums in Vietnam by capacity

See also
 Vietnam national football team
 South Vietnam national football team
 Sport in Vietnam
 Vietnam Football Federation
List of association football competitions
List of foreign footballers in Vietnam

References